Tirchai Rural District is in Kandovan District of Mianeh County, East Azerbaijan province, Iran. At the National Census of 2006, its population was 6,923 in 1,894 households. There were 6,099 inhabitants in 1,928 households at the following census of 2011. At the most recent census of 2016, the population of the rural district was 5,797 in 1,966 households. The largest of its 26 villages was Avenliq, with 1,774 people.

References 

Meyaneh County

Rural Districts of East Azerbaijan Province

Populated places in East Azerbaijan Province

Populated places in Meyaneh County